James Phillips (born 27 September 1987 in England) is a rugby union player for Sale Sharks in the Aviva Premiership. He plays as a back row or second row.

Phillips made his professional debut for Bristol against Sale Sharks in the 2007/08 season and has represented England at U16s and U18s level.

In January 2010, he extended his contract with Bristol. However, he signed for Exeter in June 2010, following Bristol's loss (to Exeter) in the Championship final.
He re-signed for Bristol in 2015, and helped them win promotion to the Aviva Premiership in May 2016. Phillips chose to leave during the 2017-18 close season to join Bath.

On 15 March 2018, Phillips signs for Premership rivals Sale Sharks on a two-year contract from the 2018-19 season.

References

External links
Bristol profile
Guinness Premiership profile

1987 births
Living people
English rugby union players
Exeter Chiefs players
People educated at Colston's School
Bristol Bears players
Rugby union players from Bristol
Rugby union flankers